Rineloricaria capitonia is a species of catfish in the family Loricariidae. It is native to South America, where it occurs in the Alegre River and the Palmeira River, which are reportedlyy tributaries of the Ijuí River, as well as the Passo Fundo River in Brazil. The species reaches 19.2 cm (7.6 inches) in standard length and is believed to be a facultative air-breather.

References 

Loricariini
Catfish of South America
Fish described in 2008
Fish of Brazil